Side Brok is a Norwegian rap group from Ørsta, in western Norway. The members of Side Brok are Sjef R, his alter ego Thorstein Hyl III, Skatebård, Tore B, Odd G and Tunk. The group received the Nynorsk User of the Year award in 2004.

Discography
Side Brok EP (2002)
Høge Brelle (2004)
Side Brooklyn EP (2005)
Kar Me Kjøme Frå (2006)
Ekte Menn (2009)
 H.O.V.D.E.B.Y.G.D.A. (2013)

External links
Official website

Norwegian hip hop groups
Musical groups from Møre og Romsdal
People from Ørsta

Musical groups with year of establishment missing